Héctor Aldair Salazar Tejada (born 19 August 1994) is a Peruvian professional footballer who plays as a defender for Peruvian Primera División club Ayacucho.

Career
In December 2018, Salazar joined Primera División club Alianza Lima on a two-year deal.

He signed for Ayacucho in January 2021 after Alianza Lima terminated his contract.

References

External links
 
 

1994 births
Living people
Peruvian footballers
Juan Aurich footballers
Deportivo Municipal footballers
Club Alianza Lima footballers
Ayacucho FC footballers
Association football defenders
Peruvian Primera División players
Sportspeople from Callao